Joaquim Soumahin (born 14 March 1998) is an Italian football player. He plays for Santarcangelo on loan from Cesena.

Club career
He made his Serie C debut for Santarcangelo on 4 October 2017 in a game against Reggiana.

References

External links
 

1998 births
People from Cesena
Living people
Italian footballers
Santarcangelo Calcio players
Serie C players
Association football wingers
Footballers from Emilia-Romagna
Sportspeople from the Province of Forlì-Cesena